In politics, a lead candidate is the leader of a political party in an election to a legislative body. In parliamentary systems, it is often the party's nominee for the position of head of government. In open list electoral systems, it is the first candidate on a party's electoral list. The lead candidate can be, but is not necessarily, the party chair or political leader.

Usage by country

Netherlands 
In the Netherlands, which uses a system of open-list proportional representation, the lead candidates (lijsttrekkers) in elections for the House of Representatives are almost always the parties' political leaders. When elected, the lead candidate usually becomes the party's parliamentary leader in the House of Representatives. When a coalition is formed, the lead candidates of the governing parties may be offered senior positions in the Cabinet, requiring them to vacate their seats in parliament. Traditionally, the lead candidate of the largest party in the governing coalition becomes Prime Minister.

The term is also used in provincial, municipal, water board and island council elections, as well as in elections to the European Parliament and the Senate. In these elections, the lead candidates of national parties tend to be different from the party leaders. They are also not the parties' nominees for the positions of King's commissioner, mayor, dike-reeve or lieutenant governor.

Belgium 
In Belgium, elections to the Chamber of Representatives only feature provincial electoral lists since the 2012–2014 state reform. As a consequence, there are usually six lead candidates per party. In general, one of them is the party leader. Prior to the state reform, some of the party leaders ran as lijsttrekker on the Senate list.

See also 
 Lijstduwer – the last candidate on the electoral list

References

Political terminology
Party-list proportional representation
Politics of the Netherlands
Politics of Belgium
Politics of Germany
Politics of the European Union